Yves Roze, better known as Jean-François Michael (born 16 April 1946) is a French singer. Between 1963 and 1968, he sang under his birth name Yves Roze. In 1968, Michel Berger (under his real name Michel Hamburger) wrote "Adieu jolie Candy" that was a hit for Jean-François Michael. It sold over one million copies, and was awarded a gold disc.

Under the new name Jean-François Michael, sometimes the "e" in Michael was written with the umlaut on the "e" as in Jean-François Michaël, he released three albums between 1968 and 1972, and a number of singles, but struck by a grave illness, he abandoned his musical career. He came back in 1975, but as a music director and record producer.

Discography

Albums
Adieu jolie Candy
Jean-François Michael
Le Retour
''Adieu jolie Candy (de 1969 à 2007) (compilation)

Singles
As Yves Roze
1967: "Sylvie"
1967: "Notre amour et puis c’est tout"
1967: "Plus fort que le vent"
As Jean-François Michael
1969: "Adieu jolie Candy"
1970: "Du fond du cœur"
1970: "Je pense à toi"
1970: "Adios quérida luna"
1970: "Più di ieri (Comme j'ai toujours envie d'aimer)"
1970: "La vie continue"
1970: "Les filles de Paris"
1971: "Je pense à toi"
1971: "Je veux vivre auprès de toi"
1971: "Un an déjà"
1971: "L’espion de l'empereur" (Soundtrack to the television series "Schulmeister")
1972: "Pour quoi faire?"
1972: "Ladybelle"
1973: "Coupable"
1973: "Comme elle"
1975: "Sans amour après l'amour"
1976: "Baby blue, I love you"
1976: "Fais un mariage d'amour"
1977: "Ne me regarde pas comme ça"
1979: "Sentiments"
1980: "Comme j’ai toujours envie d’aimer"
1981: "Elle et moi"
1982: "L'amour"
1983: "Pars pas"
1984: "Rappelle-toi Candy"

References

External links
 Official website
 Discography

1946 births
Living people
French male singers